Year 1323 (MCCCXXIII) was a common year starting on Saturday (link will display the full calendar) of the Julian calendar.

Events 
 January–December 
 March 6 – Treaty of Paris: Louis I, Count of Flanders relinquishes his claim to Zeeland.
 May 30 – Edward II makes a 13-year truce with Scotland.
 July 18 – Thomas Aquinas is canonized.
 August 12 – The Treaty of Nöteborg between Sweden and the Novgorod Republic is signed, regulating the border for the first time.

 Date unknown 
 The first Great Black Death epidemic spreads through the southern parts of Asia, killing 50 million people by 1353.
 Lithuania: In the Letters of Gediminas, Vilnius is named as the capital city.
 Remains of the Lighthouse of Alexandria (one of the Seven Wonders of the Ancient World) are toppled by the third of a series of earthquakes.
Malietoafaiga ordered cannibalism to be abolished in Tutuila, now known as American Samoa.
 A conflict between Ingeborg of Norway, and the regencies of her son in Sweden and Norway, ends with the diminution of her power.

Births 
 February 9 – Margaret of Brabant, Countess of Flanders  (d. 1380)
 Charles, Duke of Durazzo, Neapolitan noble (d. 1348)
 Bernabò Visconti, Lord of Milan, Italian soldier and statesman (d. 1385)
 Latest likely date – Constanza Manuel, queen consort of Castile (d. 1345)

Deaths 
 March 3 – Andrew Harclay, 1st Earl of Carlisle, English military leader
 August – Isabella of Burgundy, Queen of Germany (b. 1270)
 September 4 – Gegeen Khan, Emperor Yingzong of Yuan (b. 1303)
 October 16 – Amadeus V, Count of Savoy (b. 1249)
 date unknown
 King Andrew of Galicia, with his brother Leo II
 King Leo II of Galicia, with his brother Andrew (both died fighting Mongol-Tatars) (possibly Lithuanians)

References